Mubarak Shannan Zayid (born 14 April 1995) is a Qatari tennis player.

Zayid has a career high ATP singles ranking of 1159 achieved on 12 December 2016. He also has a career high ATP doubles ranking of 1332 achieved on 19 December 2016.

Zayid has represented Qatar in the Davis Cup.

Zayid made his ATP main draw debut at the 2016 Qatar ExxonMobil Open.

Zayid won bronze medal at the 2017 Islamic Solidarity Games at the men's singles event.

Future and Challenger finals

Doubles: 1 (0–1)

Islamic Solidarity Games

Singles 1 (1 bronze medal)

References

External links

1995 births
Living people
Qatari male tennis players
Asian Games competitors for Qatar
Tennis players at the 2010 Asian Games
Tennis players at the 2014 Asian Games
Tennis players at the 2018 Asian Games
Islamic Solidarity Games medalists in tennis